Sir Arthur Norman Galsworthy  (1 July 1916 – 7 October 1986) was a British soldier and diplomat. He was educated at Emanuel School and the University of Cambridge. In 1967, he was established a Knight Commander of the Order of St Michael and St George (KCMG).

In 1970, he was appointed by the British government to serve as the Governor of Pitcairn Islands and High Commissioner to New Zealand. In 1973, he was established the Ambassador to the Republic of Ireland, where he served from 1973 to 1976.

Personal background 
Galsworthy is the father of the diplomat, Sir Anthony Galsworthy. His brother, Sir John Galsworthy KCVO, CMG was the British Ambassador to Mexico 1972–1977.

Arms

References

External links 
 GALSWORTHY, Sir Arthur (Norman)’, Who Was Who, A & C Black, 1920–2008; online edn, Oxford University Press, Dec 2007 accessed 17 May 2011 

1916 births
1986 deaths
High Commissioners of the United Kingdom to New Zealand
Ambassadors of the United Kingdom to Ireland
People educated at Emanuel School
Governors of Pitcairn